The 2015 Piala Belia was the fifth season of the Piala Belia since its establishment in 2008. The league involve the youth level (Under-19) football player of Malaysian football. Selangor became the champions of the 2015 Piala Belia.

Teams
The following teams will be participate in the 2015 Piala Belia. In order by the number given by Football Association of Malaysia (FAM):-

  Perlis
  Kuala Lumpur
  Penang
  Melaka
  Pahang
  Kedah
  Johor
  Negeri Sembilan
  Selangor
  Malaysia Pahang Sports School
  Terengganu
  Sarawak
  Kelantan
  Perak
  Sabah

Team summaries

Personnel and kits
Note: Flags indicate national team as has been defined under FIFA eligibility rules. Players and Managers may hold more than one non-FIFA nationality.

League table

League table

Fixtures and results
Fixtures and Results of the Malaysia Piala Belia 2015 season.

Source: FAM

Week 1

Week 2

Week 3

Week 4

Week 5

Week 6

Week 7

Week 8

Champions

Season statistics

Scoring

Top scorers

See also

 2015 Malaysia Super League
 2015 Malaysia Premier League
 2015 Malaysia FA Cup
 2015 Malaysia President's Cup

References

External links
 Football Association of Malaysia
 SPMB 

Youth
Piala Belia